Poing is a municipality in the Upper Bavarian district of Ebersberg, lying  east of central Munich.

Geography
Poing is approximately  NE of Munich and is serviced by the Munich S-Bahn (S2) and MVV Bus systems. Poing has two
constituent communities named Angelbrechting and Grub. Poing is bordered on the east by Anzing and
Markt Schwaben, Pliening in the North, Kirchheim  to the West and Parsdorf to the South.

History
It is believed that Poing has been settled for more than 5,000 years. The ending on the community's name suggests a Celtic origin.

Population development
Over the last few decades, Poing has developed rapidly from a small village into the second biggest community on the S-Bahn line 2 (S2) area (up to Erding) and into the second biggest community in Ebersberg after Vaterstetten. In 2006, it overtook the once dominant neighboring community of Kirchheim. The sharp rise in population is due to the many new building projects in the northern
area of the city, to which no end is yet foreseen. Therefore, even more development projects are expected.

Source:  Statistisches Bundesamt Deutschland

Politics
The political parties currently represented on Poing's municipal council are the CSU, the SPD, the Greens, the FWG Poing e. V. and the FDP.

The last mayoral election was held in March 2020. Thomas Stark won the election after the previous mayor, Albert Hingerl (SPD) decided to retire after 20 years in the position.

Coat of arms
Poing's arms might heraldically be described thus: In azure a fess argent upon which a chevron Or below which an eight-pointed star argent.

From the Poing patrician family Prielmair's arms came both the star and the chevron. The shield's color and the silver fess hearken back to the community's former fast link with the House of Wittelsbach.

Culture and sightseeing

The Wildpark Poing, opened in 1970 and lies to the east of the community. In some parts of the park, visitors can walk through large outdoor enclosures containing various kinds of free roaming animals, which the public may feed.

Economy and infrastructure

Transport
Poing is serviced by the Munich S-Bahn network (S2) (Erding-Petershausen). There are two S-Bahn stops of the Munich S-Bahn. One in Poing, the other in Grub.

Highway connections include Autobahn A 94 (Munich-Passau) from Parsdorf/Poing, and from Hohenlinden Bundesstraße B 12 (towards Passau).

FTO (Flughafen-Tangente-Ost, Airport Connector Road - St2580), connects the A 94 with the airport. It is located east of the community, and opened for traffic on Sep. 9 2009. FTO provides a direct north-south connection from the A94 to the Airport, improving Poing's connections with Erding, Munich and the airport.

Businesses
The biggest business in town is the firm Canon Production Printing. The Poing plant, with roughly 1,500 workers, produces printers. Moreover, the following firms are to be found:

Avnet EM (Logistics, Silica, Time, Memec, EBV, ALS, Avnet Abacus)
BayWa (hardware and garden store)
Edeka
Best Secret GmbH / Schustermann & Borenstein GmbH
Stahlgruber, car replacement parts and accessories, founded in 1923
Oehms Classics
Fellow Consulting AG

See also 
 Poing station
 Bergfeldsee

References

External links
 History/last days of the war in Poing

Ebersberg (district)